Tetiana Yarosh (born 1 September 1984) is a Ukrainian gymnast. She finished fifth in the balance beam final at the 2000 Summer Olympics.

See also 
 List of Olympic female artistic gymnasts for Ukraine

References

External links
 

1984 births
Living people
Ukrainian female artistic gymnasts
Olympic gymnasts of Ukraine
Gymnasts at the 2000 Summer Olympics
Sportspeople from Kropyvnytskyi